HST may refer to:

Science and technology 
 The Hubble Space Telescope
 Harvard–MIT Program of Health Sciences and Technology
 The history of science and technology
 High-speed telegraphy, a radiosport
 High-Speed Transfer, a USRobotics modem protocol
 Highstand systems tract, in the sequence stratigraphy branch of geology

Transportation 
 Helsinki City Transport
 Heritage Shunters Trust, an English rail preservation society
 InterCity 125 or High Speed Train, UK
 High Street (Glasgow) railway station, Scotland, station code

Other uses 
 Half-Square or Half Square Triangle a block in quilting
Harmonized sales tax, in Canada
 Hawaii-Aleutian Standard Time (UTC−10)
 Hegemonic stability theory, in international relations
 Helicopter support team, in the United States Marine Corps
 High Sierra Trail, in California, United States
 Holden Street Theatres, Adelaide, Australia
 Homestead Air Reserve Base, Florida, US, IATA code
 Hospital Santo Tomas, in Panama City, Panama
 Harry S. Truman, President of the United States
 Hunter S. Thompson, American journalist and author
 Host Hotels & Resorts, American REIT using the stock ticker $HST